Cnephasia hellenica is a species of moth of the family Tortricidae. It is found in Portugal, Spain, Italy, Bulgaria, Romania, Greece, Ukraine and the Near East.

The wingspan is about 18 mm. The forewings are brownish grey with white admixture and with an ill-defined brownish pattern. The hindwings are brownish grey, but whitish towards the base. Adults have been recorded on wing from May to July.

References

Moths described in 1956
hellenica
Moths of Europe
Moths of Asia